The Dead at Clonmacnoise is a 14th-century poem by Aongus Ó Giolláin. It commemorates the many royal kings and princes of Ireland that were buried there.

Excerpt (translation)

See also
 Clonmacnoise

References
 1000 Years of Irish poetry, Kathleen Hoagland New York, 1947, pp. 6–8. .

14th-century poems
Irish literature